The Commune of the Working People of Estonia (initially ;  ,  or ETK) was an unrecognised government claiming the Bolshevik-occupied parts of Republic of Estonia as its territories during the Estonian War of Independence and the Russian Civil War.

Establishment and fall
The Commune was established in Narva on 29 November 1918 with the support of the Red Army. It was chaired by Jaan Anvelt for the duration of its existence.
Within areas of their control, the Commune closed churches, nationalised industry and the banks and outlawed representatives of the 
Provisional Government.

The Communist offensive was initially successful and eventually reached as far as 34 kilometres from Tallinn.  However, a counter-offensive begun on 7 January 1919 by the Estonian People's Force (Rahvavägi) under Commander-in-Chief Johan Laidoner eventually drove the Red Army out of Estonia, with international military aid primarily from the British Empire. The Commune was thus rendered defunct, claiming a government in exile in Pskov, then Luga and finally, from 17 May 1919, in Staraya Russa.

International recognition 

The Russian Socialist Federative Soviet Republic (RSFSR) formally recognised the ETK on 7 December 1918 and remained the only government to do so. At that time, Soviet Russia was itself not internationally recognised. One of the first international treaties recognising Russia's Soviet government as legitimate was the Treaty of Tartu concluding the Estonian War of Independence in 1920.

Massacres 

The regime instituted a reign of terror from November 1918 to January 1919. A considerable number of people were arrested in Tartu in December 1918 and a number of German estate owners were executed on the frozen river on January 9, 1919. A concentration camp was also set up near Luga, in January 1919. Just before Tartu was seized, the communists executed clergymen and other prisoners in the basement of a town bank, among the victims were Bishop Platon, the priest  and the pastor . Around 500 people were killed in total.

Members of the Commune 

Jaan Anvelt – Chairman of the Council and People's Commissar of Defence 
Viktor Kingissepp – People's Commissar of the Interior (actually underground in Estonia, Johannes Käspert acting for him)
Hans Pöögelmann – Commissioner for the National Economy
Artur Vallner – People's Commissar of Culture and Public Education
Johannes Mägi – People's Commissar of Foreign Affairs (from 20 December 1918 Max-Alfred Trakmann) and state control (later Karl Mühlberg)
Rudolf Vakman – Commissioner for Social Insurance (acting Otto Rästas)
Johannes Käspert – Executive Secretary of the Council 

Soviet authorities executed most of the members during the Great Purge.

See also 
Estonian Soviet Socialist Republic
Soviet Republic of Naissaar
Estonian War of Independence
Latvian Socialist Soviet Republic
Finnish Socialist Workers' Republic
Finnish Democratic Republic

Notes

References 
 Szajkowski, Bogdan. The Establishment of Marxist Regimes. London: Butterworths, 1982. p. 21-22.
   in Baltic Defence Review, No.8, Volume 2/2002.

External links 
Eesti Töörahva Kommuun 
Jaan Anvelt at arhiiv.ee.
Jaan Anvelt at postimees.ee.

Estonia, Commune of the Working People of
Estonia, Commune of the Working People of
Estonia, Commune of the Working People of
Estonia
Estonia
History of Narva
Estonia
Estonia
Communism in Estonia